Queen Seonhui of the Gyeongju Gim clan (d. 17 March 1126) was the second wife of King Sunjong of Goryeo and his primary wife when he was still a crown prince.

She entered the palace as the crown princess consort (태자비, 太子妃) to the Sunjong who was then still a crown prince and became his favourite since they were close to each other and had a good relationship. However, for some reason, she was hated badly by her father-in-law and eventually expelled from the palace by the King's order before her husband ascended the throne. Since she lived in "Yeonbok Palace" (연복궁, 延福宮), she was then given a royal title of Princess Yeonbok  (연복궁주, 延福宮主) in 1126.  On 17 March 1126, she died after about 43 years outlived than her late husband and received her Posthumous name, also buried in Seongneung tomb (성릉, 成陵) along with him in 1130 under King Injong's command.

Posthumous name
In April 1140 (18th year reign of King Injong), name Gong-ui (공의, 恭懿) was added.
In October 1253 (40th year reign of King Gojong), name Hwa-sun (화순, 和順) was added to her Posthumous name too.

References

External links
Queen Seonhui on Encykorea .
Queen Seonhui on Goryeosa .

Royal consorts of the Goryeo Dynasty
1126 deaths
Year of birth unknown
12th-century deaths
11th-century Korean people